South of Santa Fe is a 1924 American silent western film directed by Victor Adamson under the name Denver Dixon, a pseudonym he often used. A low budget film, it starred Art Mix. It premiered on July 16, 1924, in Chillicothe, Ohio.

References

External links

American silent films
American black-and-white films
1924 drama films
1924 films
Films directed by Victor Adamson
1920s English-language films